Afrohybanthus is a genus of flowering plants belonging to the family Violaceae.

Its native range is Tropical and Southern Africa, Madagascar, Tropical Asia to Australia.

Species:

Afrohybanthus aurantiacus 
Afrohybanthus buxifolius 
Afrohybanthus caffer 
Afrohybanthus densifolius 
Afrohybanthus enneaspermus 
Afrohybanthus fasciculatus 
Afrohybanthus indicus 
Afrohybanthus latifolius 
Afrohybanthus nyassensis 
Afrohybanthus pseudodanguyanus 
Afrohybanthus ramosissimus 
Afrohybanthus serratus 
Afrohybanthus stellarioides 
Afrohybanthus travancoricus 
Afrohybanthus tsavoensis 
Afrohybanthus verbi-divini

References

Violaceae
Malpighiales genera